is a mountain on the border of Akitakata, Hiroshima Prefecture, and Masuda, Shimane Prefecture, Japan. Situated inside the Nishi-Chugoku Sanchi Quasi-National Park, the mountain is the tallest of both Hiroshima and Shimane prefectures.

References

Osorakan
Osorakan